Baldy Mesa is an unincorporated community in the Victor Valley of the Mojave Desert, within San Bernardino County, California.  It is a rural desert community north of the Cajon Pass and the San Gabriel Mountains.

References

Unincorporated communities in San Bernardino County, California
Victor Valley
Populated places in the Mojave Desert
Unincorporated communities in California